Lesley Tomlinson (born 26 December 1959) is a Canadian cyclist. She competed at the 1996 Summer Olympics and the 2000 Summer Olympics.

References

External links
 

1959 births
Living people
Canadian female cyclists
Olympic cyclists of Canada
Cyclists at the 1996 Summer Olympics
Cyclists at the 2000 Summer Olympics
People from Spondon
Sportspeople from Derby
Commonwealth Games medallists in cycling
Commonwealth Games silver medallists for Canada
Cyclists at the 1994 Commonwealth Games
Medallists at the 1994 Commonwealth Games